Coalisland Fianna is a Gaelic Athletic Association club based in the town of Coalisland in County Tyrone, Northern Ireland.  The club was founded in 1903 and its home is Fr. Peter Campbell Park.

Honours

 Tyrone Senior Football Championship (10)
 1904/05, 1907/08, 1928, 1930, 1946, 1955, 1989, 1990, 2010, 2018
 Finalists: 1913/14, 1929, 1968, 1969, 1991, 2007, 2016, 2021

 Ulster Senior Club Football Championship Finalists: 1989
 Tyrone Senior Football League  (4)
 1972, 1989, 1991, 2003
 Tyrone Intermediate Football Championship (1) 
1984
 Tyrone Intermediate Football League: (2)
 1978, 1984
 Tyrone Division 1 Reserve Football Championship: 1987, 1990
 Tyrone Division 1B Reserve Football Championship : 2003
 Tyrone Division 2 Reserve Football Championship: 1983
 Tyrone Division 1 Reserve Football League: 1987, 1990 2020
 Tyrone Division 2 Reserve Football League: 1981, 1984
 Tyrone Under 21 Football Championship: (7) 1984, 1985, 1986, 1987, 1988, 2007, 2008
 Tyrone Minor Football Championship: (10) 1943, 1950, 1952, 1961, 1982, 1985, 1991, 1995, 2000, 2006
 Ulster Minor Club Football Championship: 2006
 Paul McGirr Ulster Under-16 Football Championship: 2005
 Tyrone Juvenile Football Championship: (8) 1960, 1966, 1967, 1973, 1975, 1995, 1999.
 Tyrone Under 16 Football Championship: (3) 2004, 2011, 2013
 Tyrone Under 16 Football League: 1999, 2004 Grade 2: 2018
 Tyrone Under 14 Grade 1 Football Championship: 1997

External links
Official Coalisland Fianna GAA Club website

Coalisland
Gaelic games clubs in County Tyrone
Gaelic football clubs in County Tyrone